The Instituto Militar de Engenharia (IME) is an engineering institute maintained by the Brazilian Army with federal support. IME is the oldest and one of the best ranked engineering schools in Brazil, according to the Brazilian Ministry of Education. Its current campus is located in Urca, Rio de Janeiro, opposite the entrance to the Sugar Loaf cable car.

History
The Institute was founded by the Portuguese colonial administration in 1792, as the Real Academia de Artilharia, Fortificação e Desenho (Royal Academy of Artillery, Fortification and Drawing), on the model of the Fortification, Artillery and Drawing Academy of Lisbon. IME is the third oldest engineering school in the world and the oldest in Americas. The school is known for having produced some of Brazil's most notable researchers and public figures.

Teaching and admission

The school's undergraduate admission exam is considered one of the most difficult in the country, due to the high level of the questions presented on the tests. Applicants are evaluated through a set of examinations in Math, Physics, Chemistry, Portuguese and English. The exam questions feature exercises from previous Mathematics, Physics and Chemistry Olympiads, as well as new ones.
The Brazilian Ministry of Education develops a periodical evaluation (both through tests applied on undergraduate students and infrastructure and faculty evaluation), and IME is usually ranked among the top three schools of the country in each of its Engineering disciplines.

Engineering programs
 Civil Engineering Department
 Civil Engineering B.Sc.
 Transportation Engineering M.Sc.
 Electrical Engineering Department
 Electrical Engineering B.Sc.
 Electronics Engineering B.Sc.
 Electrical Engineering M.Sc.
 Telecommunications Engineering B.Sc.
 Mechanical Engineering Department
 Mechanical and Automotive Engineering B.Sc.
 Armament Mechanics Engineering B.Sc.
 Materials Engineering B.Sc.
 Materials Science M.Sc.
 Materials Science D.Sc.
 Chemical Engineering Department
 Chemical Engineering B.Sc.
 Chemistry M.Sc.
 Chemistry D.Sc.
 Cartography Engineering Department
 Cartography Engineering B.Sc.
 Cartography Engineering M.Sc.
 Computer Engineering Department
 Computer Engineering B.Sc.
 Computing and Systems M.Sc.
 Defense Engineering Graduate Program
 Defense Engineering M.Sc.
 Defense Engineering D.Sc.

Notable alumni
 Euclides da Cunha, Writer and sociologist
 Casimiro Montenegro Filho, Founder of the Technological Institute of Aeronautics
 Francisca Fernández-Hall Zúñiga, Guatemalan, first female graduate—class of 1950

References

External links

See also

Brazil University Rankings
Universities and Higher Education in Brazil
Escola de Comando e Estado-Maior do Exército (Brazil)

 
Rio de Janeiro
Universities and colleges in Rio de Janeiro (city)
1792 establishments in Brazil
Engineering universities and colleges in Brazil
Undergraduate military academies of Brazil
Brazilian Army